The discography of Helmet, a New York-based alternative metal band formed in 1989, consists of eight full-length studio albums, two compilation albums, 15 singles, and 14 music videos. This list does not include material performed by members or former members of Helmet that was recorded with Adair, Anthrax, Band of Susans, Biohazard, The Cult, Disturbing the Peace, Exodus, Norma Jean, Testament, Tomahawk and White Zombie.

Biography
Helmet appeared on the New York underground scene in 1989 after vocalist/guitarist Page Hamilton had left Band of Susans. They were spotted by Tom Hazelmyer and signed to his Amphetamine Reptile Records label, releasing their debut 7 inch single, "Born Annoying", later that year. The label then released their first album, Strap It On, in 1990. After touring in support of that album, Helmet signed to Interscope Records in 1991 and started recording their second album, Meantime, which was released a year later. Meantime was far more successful, peaking at number one on the Billboard Heatseekers chart, and in 68th position on Billboard 200. The critically acclaimed album also provided their first ever charting single "Unsung", which remains one of Helmet's live staples the album has sold over 2 million copies worldwide, and later became the band's only album to achieve Gold status in the United States.

After the release of Meantime, original guitarist Peter Mengede left Helmet on bad terms and was replaced by Rob Echeverria. The band returned to the studio with co-producer T-Ray in the fall of 1993, to record their third album. Betty, released in June 1994, earned the band its highest chart position, debuting at #45 on the Billboard 200 chart, with "Milquetoast", "Biscuits for Smut" and "Wilma's Rainbow" in particular becoming major rock radio hits at the time. Despite this, the album was not as successful as Meantime, and Echeverria soon left Helmet to join Biohazard. The band continued as a three-piece while recording their next album, Aftertaste, which was released in 1997. After recording was complete, guitarist Chris Traynor (formerly of Orange 9mm) was recruited for the supporting tour. Although "Exactly What You Wanted" became a moderate radio hit, the album spent only a few weeks on the Billboard 200 chart. In 1998, Helmet decided to break up after "9 years, 1600 shows" and 5 albums.

A long period of inactivity ended in early 2004 when Hamilton decided to resurrect Helmet, with a new lineup of John Tempesta on drums and Chris Traynor (guitarist on the Aftertaste tour) on bass. This lineup recorded the band's first post-reunion album Size Matters, which was released in September 2004. After recording was done, bassist Frank Bello was brought in so Traynor could return to guitar. However, Bello left before its conclusion to reunite with Anthrax, who was then reuniting with the "classic" Among the Living lineup. Jeremy Chatelain replaced Bello for the duration of the tour. Tempesta also left band in early 2006 to join the reunited Cult.

In late 2005, Helmet abandoned their fourteen-year relationship with Interscope and signed with Warcon Enterprises. The band had also announced that a new album was in the works for an early summer 2006 release. Helmet performed at the 2006 South by Southwest festival in Austin, Texas, with a temporary lineup consisting of Charlie Walker on drums, Chris Traynor on bass, and Anthony Truglio (formerly of Gandhi) on guitar. The new album, Monochrome, released in July 2006, was recorded and co-produced by Wharton Tiers, who recorded Helmet's first two albums. For the album, Hamilton and Traynor returned to the studio with newly recruited drummer, Mike Jost (formerly of Adair). Helmet headlined the 2006 Warped Tour in support of Monochrome, with Jeremy Chatelain reprising his role from the 2005 Size Matters tour.

Helmet's seventh studio album, Seeing Eye Dog, was released on September 7, 2010, via Work Song, the label imprint shared by singer/songwriter Joe Henry and Helmet mainman Page Hamilton's manager. The band did not release their next studio album, Dead to the World, until 2016.

Studio albums

Compilation albums

Live albums

Singles

Music videos
 "Bad Mood" (1991)
 "Blacktop" (1991)
 "Unsung" (John Peel Version) (1991)
 "Unsung" (1992)
 "Give It" (1992)
 "In the Meantime" (1993)
 "Milquetoast" (1994)
 "Biscuits for Smut" (1994)
 "Wilma's Rainbow" (1994)
 "Exactly What You Wanted" (1997)
 "Smart" (2005)
 "Gone" (2006)
 "Monochrome" (2006)
 "Money Shot" (2007)
 "So Long" (2011)
 "Life or Death"(2017)

Other appearances

References

Heavy metal group discographies
Post-hardcore group discographies
Discographies of American artists